Mong Pan  or ဝဵင်းမိူင်းပၼ်ႇ is a town and seat of Mong Pan Township in the southern Shan State of Burma.  To the south it borders Mae Hong Son Province in Thailand and lies west of the Salween River. It lies along National Road 45.

History
This town was formerly the residence of the Sawbwa of Mongpan State. The four districts of Möng Tang, Möng Hang, Möng Kyawt and Möng Hta, located to the south on the east bank of the Salween belonged to the Cis-Salween Sawbwa of Möngpan. In 1888 there was trouble owing to the action of Siam, who attempted to take possession of them. Siamese troops were posted in the four districts. Siam also claimed a further district, Möng Hsat, but posted no troops there.

References 

Populated places in Shan State
Township capitals of Myanmar